Charles V. Feeney (November 26, 1924 – March 17, 2014) was an American sportswriter in New York City and Pittsburgh for more than 40 years.

Career
Born in Queens, New York, Feeney broke into the newspaper business at age 16 as a messenger for the New York Sun. During World War II, he served in the Navy from  1942 to 1946, earning a Bronze Star for his work as a radio man on the aircraft carrier . Feeney next worked for the Long Island Star Journal, where, starting in 1951, he would cover the Giants' final eight seasons in New York. From 1958, he covered the Yankees, first for the Star Journal, and, from 1964, for the New York Journal American. Following that paper's demise in 1966, when a job opening in Pittsburgh was created by the premature death of longtime Pirates beat writer Jack Hernon, Post-Gazette sports editor Al Abrams promptly turned to Feeney, who would fill the position until his retirement in 1986. In addition, following the retirement of Pittsburgh Press sports editor and longtime Bucs beat writer Les Biederman in March 1969, Feeney succeeded Biederman as The Sporting News''' Pirates correspondent, in which capacity he would also serve until his retirement.

After learning of his selection, Feeney joked, "I always looked at myself as a utility infielder in our business. The next thing you know they're going to be putting Tommy Helms in the Hall of Fame. I'm in and Bill Mazeroski isn't. It's unbelievable."

As of 2009, Feeney had been living in the same apartment in Pittsburgh since 1966.  That year, following the death of his wife and health problems, he moved into an assisted living facility in New York.

Selected articles by Feeney
Hard Luck No Stranger (Ferguson Jenkins), Baseball Digest, January 1969
The Tooth-less Greeting: Day Brown Met Hebner (Richie Hebner), Pittsburgh Post-Gazette, May 6, 1969
3,000 Base Hits -- Next Goal for Clemente? (Roberto Clemente), Baseball Digest, October 1969
Willie's Way (Willie Stargell), Pittsburgh Post-Gazette, September 22, 1971
The Old Pro (José Pagán), Pittsburgh Post-Gazette, March 30, 1972
Clemente: Next to Join 3,000 Hit Club (Roberto Clemente), Baseball Digest, August 1972
Sparky Lyle: Key to 'New' Yankees (Sparky Lyle), Baseball Digest, November 1972
Willie Mays Recalls His Rookie Year (Willie Mays), Baseball Digest, December 1973
The Iron Man Pitcher With Shortstop Arm (Mike Marshall), Pittsburgh Post-Gazette, July 2, 1974
Alvin Dark: A Man for All Seasons (Alvin Dark), Pittsburgh Post-Gazette, October 17, 1974
The 78-Year-Old Oakland Cheerleader (George Blanda), Pittsburgh Post-Gazette, December 27, 1974
Mr. Television for One Night (Ron Lyle), Pittsburgh Post-Gazette, May 15, 1975
Pressure? What Pressure? (Sparky Anderson), Pittsburgh Post-Gazette, October 17, 1975
One of a Kind (Danny Murtaugh), Pittsburgh Post-Gazette, December 4, 1976
Putting the Rapp on Hrabosky (Vern Rapp/Al Hrabosky), Pittsburgh Post-Gazette, July 21, 1977
Martin Reads George Between lines (Billy Martin), Pittsburgh Post-Gazette'', October 18, 1977

References

External links
 
 1996 J.G. Taylor Spink Award Winner Charley Feeney at National Baseball Hall of Fame

Baseball writers
1924 births
2014 deaths
Writers from Pittsburgh
People from Queens, New York
Pittsburgh Post-Gazette people
Journalists from New York City
Journalists from Pennsylvania
BBWAA Career Excellence Award recipients